Elastic NV is an American-Dutch company that was founded in 2012 in Amsterdam, the Netherlands, and was previously known as Elasticsearch. It is a search company that builds self-managed and software as a service (SaaS) offerings for search, logging, security, observability, and analytics use cases.

The company develops the Elastic Stack—Elasticsearch, Kibana, Beats, and Logstash—previously known as the ELK Stack, free and paid proprietary features (formerly called X-Pack), Elastic Cloud (a family of SaaS offerings including the Elasticsearch Service), and Elastic Cloud Enterprise (ECE).

Elasticsearch technology is used by eBay, Wikipedia, Yelp, Uber, Lyft, Tinder, and Netflix. Elasticsearch is also implemented in use cases such as application search, site search, enterprise search, logging, infrastructure monitoring, application performance management, security analytics (also used to augment security information and event management applications), and business analytics. The Elasticsearch meetup community totals more than 100,000 members. Elastic is publicly traded on the New York Stock Exchange under the symbol ESTC.

Citing headwinds from the global macroeconomic environment, Elastic NV announced a 13% reduction in headcount on November 30, 2022.

Acquisitions
In 2016, Elastic acquired Prelert, a machine learning company specialising in anomaly detection.

In 2017, Elastic acquired Swiftype, a provider of search and index software.

In 2019, Elastic acquired Endgame, an endpoint security provider, for $234million.

In 2021, Elastic acquired build.security, a cloud security company focusing on policy definition and enforcement.

References

Companies based in Amsterdam
Companies listed on the New York Stock Exchange
2018 initial public offerings
Dutch companies established in 2012